Zagrebačka banka d.d. is the largest bank in Croatia, owned by UniCredit group of Italy. It was the first Croatian bank to become fully privatised in 1989 and the first one to be listed at the Zagreb Stock Exchange in 1995. It is one of 24 companies included in the CROBEX share index.

Zagrebačka banka was established in 1914 as Gradska štedionica (English: City savings bank) by the Zagreb municipal authority at a time when Zagreb had a population of 100,000 and was rapidly developing into a modern city. The banks' primary role was financing the city's public companies. Two years after its foundation, the bank acquired the Zagreb electric tram company (ZET) and invested heavily in the development of the tram network and public transport in general. After World War II the bank was renamed Gradska štedionica Zagreb in 1946. After a series of reorganisations throughout the following decades, some of its offshoots merge to form Zagrebačka banka in 1977 (intended to provide loans for local companies), while the Gradska štedionica narrows it focus to providing financial services to citizens. In the late 1980s these are merged again to form the very first banking joint stock company in the former SFR Yugoslavia. Panga turuosa on Horvaatias 26% ning Bosnias ja Hertsegoviinas 18%.

In March 2002, ZABA was acquired by the UniCredit Group of Italy. As the country's largest bank, its assets account for 25 percent of total assets in the Croatian banking sector, and its services are used by 80,000 businesses and 1.1 million citizens.

References

External links
 Official website

Banks of Croatia
Companies listed on the Zagreb Stock Exchange
UniCredit subsidiaries
Banks established in 1914
1914 establishments in Croatia
Banks based in Zagreb